River of Teeth is a 2017 alternate history novella by Sarah Gailey. It was first published by Tor Books. The cover art is by Richard Anderson.

Synopsis
As one of his last acts of his presidency in early 1861, President James Buchanan approved the Hippo Act, a plan to import hippopotamuses into the United States as livestock. Decades later, the lawless swamps of Louisiana are infested with murderous feral hippos, and Winslow Houndstooth and his band of misfits are hired to clear them out.

Reception
River of Teeth was a finalist for the Nebula Award for Best Novella of 2017, and the 2018 Hugo Award for Best Novella.

Kirkus Reviews considered it to be "delightful" and "fun and charming", comparing it to Ocean's Eleven, but faulted it for having some "awkward transitions".<ref name=Kirkus>Of Hippos and Humans, by Ana Grilo, at Kirkus Reviews; published June 9, 2017; retrieved June 13, 2018</ref> Publishers Weekly called it "intricate", with a "tight pace" and "complex relationships" between characters, commending Gailey's exposition.

Writing for National Public Radio, Amal El-Mohtar praised Gailey's worldbuilding, but felt that the "characters (were) somewhat ill-served at novella length". At Strange Horizons, Samira Nadkarni emphasized that the story was "fun" and "action-adventure escapism", lauding the portrayal of a romance between bisexual Houndstooth and nonbinary Hero Shackleby; however, Nadkarni also criticized the focus on single aspects of the intersectional characters' identities, and observed that Gailey omitted entire indigenous populations who historically would have lived in that part of Louisiana.

Background
The story is inspired by Louisiana Congressman Robert F. Broussard's 1910 plan to import hippopotamuses to America, with the intent that they would eat invasive water hyacinth and serve as meat animals.Sarah Gailey on Heists, Hope, Feral Hippos, and Defiantly Joyful Characters, by Alasdair Stuart, at Tor.com; published May 30, 2017; retrieved June 13, 2018 In regards to the "very little discrimination" which the characters encounter, Gailey has admitted that the worldbuilding involves "judicious handwaving", in that "(i)f someone were to extrapolate the history of the world that had to develop in order for this story to happen, they’d probably need to cut out a lot of slavery and colonialism and Western Imperialism from America’s history."

Sequel
In October 2017, Tor Books released Taste of Marrow, which follows the characters of River of Teeth'' in the months following the events of that book.

References

2017 LGBT-related literary works
Alternate history novellas
Cultural depictions of James Buchanan
Fictional hippopotamuses
American novellas
American LGBT novels
2010s LGBT novels
Louisiana in fiction
LGBT speculative fiction novels
Novels set in Louisiana
Tor Books books